James J. Kelly Jr. was an American football running back who played one season in the American Professional Football Association with the Detroit Heralds. He first enrolled at Saint Louis University before transferring to the University of Detroit.

References

External links
Just Sports Stats

Year of birth missing
Year of death missing
American football running backs
Saint Louis Billikens football players
Detroit Titans football players
Detroit Heralds players